A Studio at Les Batignolles is an oil-on-canvas painting by Henri Fantin-Latour created in 1870. The work is now at the Musée d'Orsay.

Description
Its staging evokes the studio of French painter Édouard Manet and represents him seated and painting. Seated beside him is Zacharie Astruc. The other figures from left to right are painters Otto Scholderer, Pierre-Auguste Renoir, writer Émile Zola (bearded with eyeglasses in his hand), Edmond Maître, Frédéric Bazille (in profile), and Claude Monet. It is known a portrait of Zacharie Astruc by Manet, and it is perhaps the episode of the creation of this painting that is represented.

The painting was exhibited at the 1870 Salon, in Paris.

See also
 Batignolles group

References

External links
 A Studio at Les Batignolles at the Musée d'Orsay

Paintings in the collection of the Musée d'Orsay
Paintings by Henri Fantin-Latour
1870 paintings
Group portraits by French artists
Paintings about painting
Cultural depictions of Claude Monet
Cultural depictions of Pierre-Auguste Renoir
Cultural depictions of Édouard Manet